Levi Cook (December 16, 1792 – December 2, 1866) was an American business and politician who served two terms the mayor of Detroit, Michigan, and one in the Michigan House of Representatives.

Cook was born in Bellingham, Massachusetts, on December 16, 1792, the son of Thadeus Cook.  He moved to Detroit in 1815, and that same year became one of the trustees of the city.  He also served as City Treasurer in 1822, County Commissioner from 1824–27, Superintendent of the Poor from 1827–28, and city alderman in 1828.  He was both Treasurer of the Michigan Territory and Chief Engineer of the Fire Department from 1830–36, mayor of Detroit in 1832, 1835–36, a member of the Michigan House of Representatives in 1838, and a member of the city Board of Review in 1840–41.  He was originally a Whig, but later in life a Republican.

Cook was a dry goods merchant. He was also a director of the Farmers' and Mechanics' Bank, and served as its president from 1838–45.

He married Elizabeth Stevens of Boston in 1818, but the couple had no children.  Levi Cook died on December 2, 1866.

References

1792 births
1866 deaths
County commissioners in Michigan
Members of the Michigan House of Representatives
Detroit City Council members
Mayors of Detroit
People from Bellingham, Massachusetts
Michigan Whigs
19th-century American politicians
Michigan Republicans